Kalda may refer to:

Places in Estonia
Kalda, Pärnu County, a village in Saarde Parish, Pärnu County
Kalda, Rapla County, a village in Rapla Parish, Rapla County

People with the surname
Aino Kalda (born 1929), Estonian botanist and bryologist
Erik Kalda (born 1969), Estonian journalist (:et)
Helle Kalda (born 1950), Estonian politician
Hillar Kalda (born 1932), Estonian physician and politician
Maie Kalda (born 1929), Estonian literary scientist and critic; see Letter of 40 intellectuals
Piret Kalda (born 1966), Estonian actress

Estonian-language surnames